Mitchell High School is a public high school located in Mitchell, South Dakota. It serves students in grades 9 through 12, and is the only high school in the Mitchell School District.

History
High school classes were held in the Central School until 1909, when a new Mitchell High School was built.

By the 2010s, there was an alternative school, Second Chance HS, for at-risk students that provided a small, more customized learning environment.

Demographics
The location and nature of Mitchell High School is rural.
The student body of Mitchell High School is 85 percent white, five percent Native American, five percent Hispanic, one percent African-American, one percent Asian, and three percent of students identify as a part of two or more races.

Athletics
The school athletic teams are the Mitchell Kernels; the moniker was adopted in the 1930s. The school mascot is called Cornelius. Both are references to the Mitchell Corn Palace.

Kernel athletic teams compete in the Eastern South Dakota Conference.

Performing arts
In February 2017, MHS opened the largest high school auditorium in the state of South Dakota.

MHS has a competitive show choir, "Friend de Coup". FDC won a national-level competition in 2000 and won the state competition sanctioned by the South Dakota High School Activities Association all three years the contest was held (2016–18). The school also hosts an annual competition.

Other activities
The school student newspaper, The Kernel, was cut due to budgetary pressures in 2017, but remained in publication as a club activity in association with the local regular newspaper The Daily Republic.

Notable alumni
 George McGovern, graduated 1940, U.S. Senator and 1972 Democratic Party presidential nominee
 Mike Miller, graduated 1998, former professional basketball player, coach for the Houston High School, Rookie of the Year, and 2x champion

References

External links
 Mitchell High School
 Mitchell City Schools

Public high schools in South Dakota
Schools in Davison County, South Dakota